Anita Zucker (born 1951/1952) is an American businesswoman and philanthropist. She was the chair at the Hudson's Bay Company. Taking over after her husband's death, she is now the chairperson and chief executive officer (CEO) of The Intertech Group.  She is the wealthiest person to reside in the state of South Carolina.

Early life and education
Born Anita Goldberg, Zucker is the daughter of Holocaust survivors, Rose and Carl Goldberg. She graduated from the University of Florida and received a Master of Arts from the University of North Florida.

Career
After moving with her husband Jerry to the Charleston area in 1978, the couple launched InterTech in 1982.

She is the widow of Jerry Zucker, and took over his role as chairman and chief executive officer of the Intertech Group following his death in 2008 from a brain tumor.

She owns the Carolina Ice Palace and is part owner of the South Carolina Stingrays ice hockey team.

As of February 2023, she is the 1600th richest person in the world (up from 1729th in 2022), with an estimated wealth of US $1.9 billion. She has three children: Jonathan Zucker, Andrea Muzin and Jeffrey Zucker. She lives in Charleston, South Carolina.

Politics
Zucker is a member of the Republican Party, and she endorsed Mitt Romney in January 2012. A financial supporter of Lindsey Graham, she was a co-chair in South Carolina of Jeb Bush's campaign for the Republican party nomination in South Carolina in 2016.

Philanthropy
Zucker is part of the Coastal Community Foundation and Trident United Way, and is a trustee of the Saul Alexander Foundation and the Jewish Endowment Fund. She has served on the boards of the Charleston Metro Chamber of Commerce, the MUSC Foundation, and Porter-Gaud School.

In November 2014, she donated $4 million to The Citadel, The Military College of South Carolina for education programs.  In return, The Citadel named its School of Education after the Zucker family, the first of The Citadel's five schools to be named after a major donor.

Personal life
She was married to Jerry Zucker, until his death, and they had three children, Jonathan Zucker, Andrea Muzin and Jeffrey Zucker. Jonathan is the president of the InterTech Group. Jeffrey is an entrepreneur in the cannabis industry. She lives in Charleston, South Carolina.

References

1950s births
Living people
21st-century American Jews
21st-century American women
American billionaires
American retail chief executives
American women in business
Businesspeople from Charleston, South Carolina
Female billionaires
Governors of the Hudson's Bay Company
Jewish American philanthropists
South Carolina Republicans
The Citadel, The Military College of South Carolina people
University of Florida alumni
University of North Florida alumni